David Ferguson (born 24 March 1996) is a Scottish footballer who plays as a defender for Berwick Rangers.

Ferguson is a product of the Motherwell Academy. He has also played for Ayr United and Peterhead, and has spent time on loan at Alloa Athletic, Annan Athletic, Airdrieonians, and Dumbarton.

Career

Motherwell 
On 13 August 2014, Ferguson made his debut for Motherwell as a half-time substitute in a narrow 1–0 defeat against Dundee United.

On 27 March 2015, Ferguson moved on loan to Scottish Championship club Alloa Athletic until 16 May 2015. Ferguson moved on loan to Annan Athletic on 1 September 2015, on a deal until January 2016. After his loan deal at Annan ended, Ferguson moved on loan to Airdrieonians, alongside fellow Well player Dylan Mackin.

Ferguson signed a new one-year contract with Motherwell on 26 May 2016. He was released by the club in May 2017, at the end of his contract.

Ayr United 
Ferguson signed for Ayr United in July 2017, before joining Dumbarton on loan in January 2019.

Peterhead 
On 30 August 2019, having been released by Ayr, Ferguson signed for Peterhead.

Berwick Rangers 
During the 2020-21 season, Ferguson was training with Berwick Rangers and appeared as a trialist in three Lowland League games, and scored the winning goal in a match against the University of Stirling. Berwick confirmed the signing of Ferguson on 12 November 2020.

Career statistics

References

External links
 
 David Ferguson profile at Motherwell FC official website
 

1996 births
Living people
Scottish footballers
Association football defenders
Motherwell F.C. players
Alloa Athletic F.C. players
Annan Athletic F.C. players
Airdrieonians F.C. players
Scottish Professional Football League players
Ayr United F.C. players
Dumbarton F.C. players
Peterhead F.C. players
Berwick Rangers F.C. players
Lowland Football League players